The Box is a 1967 American animated short film directed by Fred Wolf.

Summary
It retells the story of Noah's Ark set in a bar with an old man carrying a box while others who come into there each wanting to know what's inside there.

Accolades
The film won the Academy Award for Best Animated Short Film at the 40th Academy Awards.

Preservation
The Box was preserved by the Academy Film Archive in 2003.

See also
1967 in film
Limited animation

References

External links
 
The Box on YouTube
The Box on Internet Archive

1967 films
1967 animated films
1960s animated short films
American animated short films
Noah's Ark in popular culture
Noah's Ark in film
Best Animated Short Academy Award winners
Animated films without speech
1960s rediscovered films
Rediscovered American films
1960s English-language films
1960s American films